Satyabrata Pal was an Indian Civil servant and was the Indian ambassador to Pakistan.

Positions held
Member National Human Rights Commission (NHRC).
Ambassador to South Africa.

Indian Foreign Service
He was a 1972 batch officer of the Indian Foreign Service.

Death
Ambassador Pal died on 24 September 2019.

Indian Ambassadors to Pakistan

External Links

 Satyabrata Pal's Articles on The Wire
 Satyabrata Pal's Articles in The Hindu

References

High Commissioners of India to South Africa
High Commissioners of India to Pakistan
Indian Foreign Service officers
Living people
Year of birth missing (living people)